The 2015–16 season of the Regionalliga (women) is the ninth season of Germany's third-tier women's football league using the current format.

Nord

Nordost

West

Südwest

Süd

Top scorers

References

2015-16
3